Gender studies is an interdisciplinary academic field devoted to analysing gender identity and gendered representation. Gender studies originated in the field of women's studies, concerning women, feminism, gender, and politics. The field now overlaps with queer studies and men's studies. Its rise to prominence, especially in Western universities after 1990, coincided with the rise of deconstruction.

Disciplines that frequently contribute to gender studies include the fields of literature, linguistics, human geography, history, political science, archaeology, economics, sociology, psychology, anthropology, cinema, musicology, media studies, human development, law, public health, and medicine. Gender studies also analyzes how race, ethnicity, location, social class, nationality, and disability intersect with the categories of gender and sexuality.

In gender studies, the term 'gender' is often used to refer to the social and cultural constructions of masculinity and femininity, rather than biological aspects of the male or female sex. However, this view is not held by all gender theorists.

Gender is pertinent to many disciplines, such as literary theory, drama studies, film theory, performance theory, contemporary art history, anthropology, sociology, sociolinguistics and psychology. However, these disciplines sometimes differ in their approaches to how and why gender is studied. In politics, gender can be viewed as a foundational discourse that political actors employ in order to position themselves on a variety of issues. Gender studies is also a discipline in itself, incorporating methods and approaches from a wide range of disciplines.

Many fields came to regard "gender" as a practice, sometimes referred to as something that is performative. Feminist theory of psychoanalysis, articulated mainly by Julia Kristeva and Bracha L. Ettinger, and informed both by Freud, Lacan and the object relations theory, is very influential in gender studies.

Influences

Psychoanalytic theory

A number of theorists have influenced the field of gender studies significantly, specifically in terms of psychoanalytic theory. Among these are Sigmund Freud, Jacques Lacan, Julia Kristeva, and Bracha L. Ettinger.

Gender studied under the lens of each of these theorists looks somewhat different. In a Freudian system, women are "mutilated and must learn to accept their lack of a penis" (in Freud's terms a "deformity"). Lacan, however, organizes femininity and masculinity according to different unconscious structures. Both male and female subjects participate in the "phallic" organization, and the feminine side of sexuation is "supplementary" and not opposite or complementary. Lacan uses the concept of sexuation (sexual situation), which posits the development of gender-roles and role-play in childhood, to counter the idea that gender identity is innate or biologically determined. According to Lacan, the sexuation of an individual has as much, if not more, to do with their development of a gender identity as being genetically sexed male or female.

Julia Kristeva has significantly developed the field of semiotics. She contends that patriarchal cultures, like individuals, have to exclude the maternal and the feminine so that they can come into being.

Bracha L. Ettinger transformed

 subjectivity in contemporary psychoanalysis since the early 1990s with the Matrixial feminine-maternal and prematernal Eros of borderlinking (bordureliance), borderspacing (bordurespacement) and co-emergence. The matrixial feminine difference defines a particular gaze and it is a source for trans-subjectivity and transjectivity in both males and females. Ettinger rethinks the human subject as informed by the archaic connectivity to the maternal and proposes the idea of a Demeter-Persephone Complexity.

Feminist psychoanalytic theory
Feminist theorists such as Juliet Mitchell, Nancy Chodorow, Jessica Benjamin, Jane Gallop, Bracha L. Ettinger, Shoshana Felman, Griselda Pollock, Luce Irigaray and Jane Flax have developed a Feminist psychoanalysis and argued that psychoanalytic theory is vital to the feminist project and must, like other theoretical traditions, be criticized by women as well as transformed to free it from vestiges of sexism (i.e. being censored). Shulamith Firestone, in The Dialectic of Sex, calls Freudianism the misguided feminism and discusses how Freudianism is almost completely accurate, with the exception of one crucial detail: everywhere that Freud writes "penis", the word should be replaced with "power".

Critics such as Elizabeth Grosz accuse Jacques Lacan of maintaining a sexist tradition in psychoanalysis. Others, such as Judith Butler, Bracha L. Ettinger and Jane Gallop have used Lacanian work, though in a critical way, to develop gender theory.

According to J. B. Marchand, "The gender studies and queer theory are rather reluctant, hostile to see the psychoanalytic approach."

For Jean-Claude Guillebaud, gender studies (and activists of sexual minorities) "besieged" and consider psychoanalysis and psychoanalysts as "the new priests, the last defenders of the genital normality, morality, moralism or even obscurantism".

Judith Butler's worries about the psychoanalytic outlook under which sexual difference is "undeniable" and pathologizing any effort to suggest that it is not so paramount and unambiguous ...". According to Daniel Beaune and Caterina Rea, the gender-studies "often criticized psychoanalysis to perpetuate a family and social model of patriarchal, based on a rigid and timeless version of the parental order".

Literary theory
Psychoanalytically oriented French feminism focused on visual and literary theory all along. Virginia Woolf's legacy as well as "Adrienne Rich's call for women's revisions of literary texts, and history as well, has galvanized a generation of feminist authors to reply with texts of their own". Griselda Pollock and other feminists have articulated Myth and poetry and literature, from the point of view of gender.

Post-modern influence
The emergence of post-modernism theories affected gender studies, causing a movement in identity theories away from the concept of fixed or essentialist gender identity, to post-modern fluid or multiple identities. The impact of post-structuralism, and its literary theory aspect post-modernism, on gender studies was most prominent in its challenge of grand narratives. Post-structuralism paved the way for the emergence of queer theory in gender studies, which necessitated the field expanding its purview to sexuality.

In addition to the expansion to include sexuality studies, under the influence of post-modernism gender studies has also turned its lens toward masculinity studies, due to the work of sociologists and theorists such as R. W. Connell, Michael Kimmel, and E. Anthony Rotundo.

These changes and expansions have led to some contentions within the field, such as the one between second wave feminists and queer theorists. The line drawn between these two camps lies in the problem as feminists see it of queer theorists arguing that everything is fragmented and there are not only no grand narratives but also no trends or categories. Feminists argue that this erases the categories of gender altogether but does nothing to antagonize the power dynamics reified by gender. In other words, the fact that gender is socially constructed does not undo the fact that there are strata of oppression between genders.

Development of theory

History

The history of gender studies looks at the different perspectives of gender. This discipline examines the ways in which historical, cultural, and social events shape the role of gender in different societies. The field of gender studies, while focusing on the differences between men and women, also looks at sexual differences and less binary definitions of gender categorization.

After the universal suffrage revolution of the twentieth century, the women's liberation movement of the 1960 and 1970s promoted a revision from the feminists to "actively interrogate" the usual and accepted versions of history as it was known at the time. It was the goal of many feminist scholars to question original assumptions regarding women's and men's attributes, to actually measure them, and to report observed differences between women and men. Initially, these programs were essentially feminist, designed to recognize contributions made by women as well as by men. Soon, men began to look at masculinity the same way that women were looking at femininity, and developed an area of study called "men's studies". It was not until the late 1980s and 1990s that scholars recognized a need for study in the field of sexuality. This was due to the increasing interest in lesbian and gay rights, and scholars found that most individuals will associate sexuality and gender together, rather than as separate entities.

Although doctoral programs for women's studies have existed since 1990, the first doctoral program for a potential PhD in gender studies in the United States was approved in November 2005.

In 2015, Kabul University became the first university in Afghanistan to offer a master's degree course in gender and women's studies. After the Taliban took over the Afghan capital, the university fell under their control and banned women from attending.

Women's studies

Women's studies is an interdisciplinary academic field devoted to topics concerning women, feminism, gender, and politics. It often includes feminist theory, women's history (e.g. a history of women's suffrage) and social history, women's fiction, women's health, feminist psychoanalysis and the feminist and gender studies-influenced practice of most of the humanities and social sciences.

Men's studies

Men's studies is an interdisciplinary academic field devoted to topics concerning men, gender, and politics. It often includes feminist theory, men's history and social history, men's fiction, men's health, feminist psychoanalysis and the feminist and gender studies-influenced practice of most of the humanities and social sciences. Timothy Laurie and Anna Hickey-Moody suggest that there 'have always been dangers present in the institutionalisation of "masculinity studies" as a semi-gated community', and note that 'a certain triumphalism vis-à-vis feminist philosophy haunts much masculinities research'.

Within studies on men, it is important to distinguish the specific approach often defined as Critical Studies on Men. This approach was largely developed in the anglophone countries from the early 1980s – especially in the United Kingdom –  centred then around the work of Jeff Hearn, David Morgan and colleagues. The influence of the approach has spread globally since then. It is inspired primarily by a range of feminist perspectives (including socialist and radical) and places emphasis on the need for research and practice to explicitly challenge men's and boys' sexism. Although it explores a very broad range of men's practices, it tends to focus especially on issues related to sexuality and/or men's violences. Although originally largely rooted in sociology, it has since engaged with a broad range of other disciplines including social policy, social work, cultural studies, gender studies, education and law. In more recent years, Critical Studies on Men research has made particular use of comparative and/or transnational perspectives. Like Men's Studies and Masculinity Studies more generally, Critical Studies on Men has been critiqued for its failure to adequately focus on the issue of men's relations with children as a key site for the development of men's masculinity formations – men's relations with women and men's relations with other men being the two sites which are heavily researched by comparison.

Gender in Asia and Polynesia

Certain issues associated with gender in Eastern Asia and the Pacific Region are more complex and depend on location and context. For example, in China, Vietnam, Thailand, Philippines and Indonesia, a heavy importance of what defines a woman comes from the workforce. In these countries, "gender related challenges tend to be related to economic empowerment, employment, and workplace issues, for example related to informal sector workers, feminization of migration flows, work place conditions, and long term social security". However, in countries who are less economically stable, such as Papua New Guinea, Timor Leste, Laos, Cambodia, and some provinces in more remote locations, "women tend to bear the cost of social and domestic conflicts and natural disasters".

Places such as India and Polynesia have widely identified third-gender categories. For example, the hijra/kinnar/kinner people of India are often regarded as being a third-gender. Hijra is often considered an offensive term, so the terms kinnar & kinner are often used for these individuals. In places such as India and Pakistan, these individuals face higher rates of HIV infection, depression, and homelessness. Polynesian language also is consistent with the idea of a third-gender or non-binary gender. The Samoan term fa'afafine, meaning "in the manner of a woman", is used to refer to a third-gender/non-binary role in society. These sexualities are expressed across a spectrum, although some literature has suggested that fa'afafine individuals do not form sexual relations with one another.

One issue that remains consistent throughout all provinces in different stages of development is women having a weak voice when it comes to decision-making. One of the reasons for this is the "growing trend to decentralization [which] has moved decision-making down to levels at which women's voice is often weakest and where even the women's civil society movement, which has been a powerful advocate at national level, struggles to organize and be heard".

East Asia Pacific's approach to help mainstream these issues of gender relies on a three-pillar method. Pillar one is partnering with middle-income countries and emerging middle-income countries to sustain and share gains in growth and prosperity. Pillar two supports the developmental underpinnings for peace, renewed growth and poverty reduction in the poorest and most fragile areas. The final pillar provides a stage for knowledge management, exchange and dissemination on gender responsive development within the region to begin. These programs have already been established, and successful in, Vietnam, Thailand, China, as well as the Philippines, and efforts are starting to be made in Laos, Papua New Guinea, and Timor Leste as well. These pillars speak to the importance of showcasing gender studies.

Judith Butler

The concept of gender performativity is at the core of philosopher and gender theorist Judith Butler's work Gender Trouble. In Butler's terms the performance of gender, sex, and sexuality is about power in society. She locates the construction of the "gendered, sexed, desiring subject" in "regulative discourses". A part of Butler's argument concerns the role of sex in the construction of "natural" or coherent gender and sexuality. In her account, gender and heterosexuality are constructed as natural because the opposition of the male and female sexes is perceived as natural in the social imaginary.

Criticisms
Historian and theorist Bryan Palmer argues that gender studies' current reliance on post-structuralism – with its reification of discourse and avoidance of the structures of oppression and struggles of resistance – obscures the origins, meanings, and consequences of historical events and processes, and he seeks to counter current trends in gender studies with an argument for the necessity to analyze lived experiences and the structures of subordination and power. Psychologist Debra W. Soh postulates that gender studies is composed of dubious scholarship, that it is an unscientific ideology, and that it causes needless disruption in the lives of children.

Feminist philosopher Rosi Braidotti has criticized gender studies as "the take-over of the feminist agenda by studies on masculinity, which results in transferring funding from feminist faculty positions to other kinds of positions. There have been cases... of positions advertised as 'gender studies' being given away to the 'bright boys'. Some of the competitive take-over has to do with gay studies. Of special significance in this discussion is the role of the mainstream publisher Routledge who, in our opinion, is responsible for promoting gender as a way of deradicalizing the feminist agenda, re-marketing masculinity and gay male identity instead." Calvin Thomas countered that, "as Joseph Allen Boone points out, 'many of the men in the academy who are feminism's most supportive 'allies' are gay,'" and that it is "disingenuous" to ignore the ways in which mainstream publishers such as Routledge have promoted feminist theorists.

Gender studies, and more particularly queer studies within gender studies, has been criticized by the Catholic Church as an attack on human biology. Pope Francis has said that teaching about gender identity in schools is "ideological colonization" that threatens traditional families and fertile heterosexuality. France was one of the first countries where this claim became widespread when Catholic movements marched in the streets of Paris against the bill on gay marriage and adoption. Scholar of law and gender Bruno Perreau argues that this fear has deep historical roots, and that the rejection of gender studies and queer theory expresses anxieties about national identity and minority politics. Jayson Harsin argues that the French anti-gender theory movement demonstrates qualities of global right-wing populist post-truth politics.

Teaching certain aspects of gender theory was banned in public schools in New South Wales after an independent review into how the state teaches sex and health education and the controversial material included in the teaching materials.

Government attitudes 

In Central and Eastern Europe, anti-gender movements are on the rise, especially in Hungary, Poland, and Russia.

Russia 
In Russia, gender studies is currently tolerated; however, state-supported practices follow the traditional gender perspectives of those in power. The law related to prosecuting and sentencing domestic violence, for instance, was greatly limited in 2017. Since 2010, the Russian government has also been leading a campaign at the UNHRC to recognise Russian "traditional values" as a legitimate consideration in human rights protection and promotion.

Hungary 
Gender studies programs were banned in Hungary in October 2018. In a statement released by Hungarian Prime Minister Viktor Orbán's office, a spokesperson stated that "The government's standpoint is that people are born either male or female, and we do not consider it acceptable for us to talk about socially constructed genders rather than biological sexes." The ban has attracted criticism from several European universities which offer the program, among them the Budapest-based Central European University, whose charter was revoked by the government, and is widely seen as part of the Hungarian ruling party's move away from democratic principles.

China 
The Central People's Government supports studies of gender and social development of gender in history and practices that lead to gender equality. Citing Mao Zedong's philosophy, "Women hold up half the sky", this may be seen as continuation of equality of men and women introduced as part of Cultural Revolution.

Romania 
The Romanian Senate approved by broad majority in June 2020 an update of National Education Law that would ban theories and opinions on gender identity according to which gender is a separate concept from biological sex. In December 2020, the Constitutional Court of Romania overturned the ban; earlier, President Klaus Iohannis had challenged the bill.

See also

 Androcentrism
 Gynocentrism
 Gender and politics
 Gender history
 Gender role
 Genderqueer
 Postgenderism
 Sex and gender distinction
 Social construction of gender
 Third gender
 Transgender
 Women in philosophy

References

Bibliography
 
 
 
 
 
 
 
 Cárdenas, Micha and Barbara Fornssler, 2010. Trans Desire/Affective Cyborgs. New York: Atropos press. 
 
 
 
 
 
 Ettinger, Bracha L., 2006. "From Proto-ethical Compassion to Responsibility: Besidedness, and the three Primal Mother-Phantasies of Not-enoughness, Devouring and Abandonment". Athena: Philosophical Studies. Vol. 2. .
 
 
 
 
 
 
 
 Frug, Mary Joe. "A Postmodern Feminist Legal Manifesto (An Unfinished Draft)", in "Harvard Law Review", Vol. 105, No. 5, March, 1992, pp. 1045–1075.

External links

 GenPORT: Your gateway to gender and science resources 
 xy: men, masculinities and gender politics
 WikEd – Gender Inequities in the Classroom
 Children's Gender Beliefs
 Karelian Center for Gender Studies (Regional NGO "KCGS")
 Nordic Countries Defund Gender Ideology
 The Gender Equality Paradox
 Obama Pushes for Equal Pay for Women 
 Entrepreneurship in Asia, a look at the changing culture of women entrepreneurship in Asia
Preliminary Description for the University of Chicago Center for the Study of Gender and Sexuality Records 1971-2012 at the University of Chicago Special Collections Research Center

 
Critical theory
Interdisciplinary subfields of sociology
Social philosophy
Academic disciplines